Telly Tjanggulung (1 June 1973 – 5 January 2021) was an Indonesian politician who served as Regent of Southeast Minahasa from 2008 to 2013. She was the wife of  Regent of Talaud Islands (2004–2012, and since 2020). Her daughter, Hillary Brigitta Lasut is the youngest member of parliament who served since 2019.

She was nominated to became candidate for running in 2020 Manado mayoral election, but failed to get the ticket.

She died on 5 January 2021. She was buried at Koha cemetery, Minahasa on 8 January 2021. The atrium of the regent of Southeast Minahasa's office is named after her.

References

1973 births
2021 deaths
Mayors and regents of places in North Sulawesi
Women regents of places in Indonesia
Politicians from North Sulawesi
People from Tomohon
21st-century Indonesian politicians